The Rockford Pro-Am Golf Tournament, also known as the Rockford ProAm, is a one-day tournament featuring golf professionals, sponsors and amateur golf enthusiasts in order to raise funds for special organizations.  It is the longest free-standing pro-am (not attached to the PGA or LPGA) event in the United States.  It is normally held in July following the John Deere Classic. More commonly known as just the Rockford Pro-Am, the event celebrated its 42nd anniversary in 2018.

There are normally 20-25 professionals are teamed up with teams of four amateurs.

Past Rockford Pro-Am attendees include Arnold Palmer, Bob Hope, Kenny Perry, Fred Couples, Paul Azinger, Billy Mayfair, Russ Cochran, John Daly, Hale Irwin, Laura Davies, Jim Dent, Jim Thorpe, Calvin Peete, Dana Quigley, Larry Mize, Ben Crenshaw, Lee Janzen, Matt Kuchar, Zach Johnson, Brittany Lincicome, Ken Duke, David Hearn, Troy Merritt, Ryan Palmer, Kyle Stanley, Scott Piercy, Kevin Streelman, Chesson Hadley, Ted Potter, Jr, Cameron Tringale, Bud Cauley, Wesley Bryan, Patrick Rodgers, Brittany Lang, Stacy Lewis, Gerina and Martin Piller, Luke Guthrie, Scott Langley, DA Points, Emma Talley, Austin Ernst, Mariah Stackhouse.

History
The pro-am was started as a fund raiser for the three Rockford area hospitals in 1977 - Rockford Memorial Hospital, St. Anthony Hospital and SwedishAmerican Hospital and was initially hosted by the Rockford Country Club from 1977-1996.  This was changed to being a benefit for non-profit organizations, three picked per year by the organizers.

Many celebrities and professional golfers have come to the event.  For a few years in the early 1980s, comedian and ultimate golf enthusiast Bob Hope would come to entertain at a benefit gala at the then-newly opened MetroCentre the play in the pro-am the next day.  Other entertainers who participated included Hope's long-time friend and fellow comedian George Burns and the star of TV's Wonder Woman Lynda Carter.

Other pros who made appearances include Gary Player, Chi-Chi Rodríguez, Jim Thorpe, Lee Trevino and LPGA veteran Nancy Lopez.

TV Coverage
13 WREX broadcasts live from the golf course during the newscasts and produces a coverage program in the afternoon.

References

External links
Forest Hills Country Club, Rockford, IL
Rockford Country Club, Rockford, IL
13 WREX-Rockford Pro-Am
Forrest Hills Country Club-Interactive Map courtesy Rockford Register-Star

Pro–am golf tournaments
Charity events in the United States
Golf in Illinois
Sports in Rockford, Illinois